Frederick Porter Smith (1833–1888) was one of the first British medical missionaries to China, in the 19th century.  The Wesleyan Missionary Committee sent him to Hankow, China, for both philanthropic and evangelical reasons late in 1863.

Writings
He wrote several books on China while there and after his return; his 1871 work is only the second English-language work to mention soybean sprouts. Smith also reported on the use of tobacco and of opium in his territory, opining that moderate opium use was "not incompatible with the health of those who practice it".

Works
 The Rivers of China (1869)
 A Vocabulary Of Proper Names, In Chinese And English: Of Places, Persons, Tribes, And Sects, In China, Japan, Korea, Annam, Siam, Burma (1870)
 
 Chinese Materia Medica: Vegetable Kingdom (1911) (with George Arthur Stuart)

References 

English Methodist missionaries
Methodist missionaries in China
Christian medical missionaries
1833 births
1888 deaths
British expatriates in China